Longjing Station may refer to:

 Longjing Station (Shenzhen) (龙井站) on Line 7 of the Shenzhen Metro in Shenzhen, People's Republic of China
 Longjing Station (Taiwan) (龍井車站) on the Western Line of the Taiwan Railway Administration